Ricardo Mangue Obama Nfubea (born c. 1961) is a politician from Equatorial Guinea and a member of PDGE. He was Prime Minister from 2006 to 2008. He is a lawyer by profession.

Mangue Obama has worked as President Teodoro Obiang Nguema's lawyer. In the government named on February 11, 2003, he was appointed Minister of State in charge of the Civil Service and Administrative Coordination. He was Second Deputy Prime Minister in the government of Prime Minister Miguel Abia Biteo Boricó, and also previously held the labor and education portfolios. Following the resignation of Abia Biteo Boricó and his government on August 10, 2006, Mangue Obama Nfubea was appointed Prime Minister by President Obiang on August 14, 2006, becoming the first member of the majority Fang community to serve in this post.

On July 4, 2008, Mangue resigned along with his entire government, stating that his government had been "unable to achieve the wishes of His Excellency, the President of the Republic, to make our country a developed and prosperous one". Speaking on television afterward, Obiang criticized Mangue's government as "one of the worst ever formed", going so far as to say that some members of the government had attempted to destabilize Equatorial Guinea, and he asserted that it would be necessary to "change the entire government". Ignacio Milam Tang was appointed to succeed Mangue on July 8.

References 

Living people
1961 births
Equatoguinean lawyers
Democratic Party of Equatorial Guinea politicians
Education ministers of Equatorial Guinea
Labour ministers of Equatorial Guinea
Deputy Prime Ministers of Equatorial Guinea